The Agony in the Garden of Gethsemane is an episode in the life of Jesus. After the Last Supper, Jesus enters a garden where he experiences great anguish and prays to be delivered from his impending death on the cross ("Take this cup from me") while also submitting to his Father's will. The incident is described in the Synoptic Gospels (
Matthew 26:36–46,
Mark 14:32–42,
Luke 22:39–46). In this episode of the life of Jesus, he is faced with the betrayal of his disciple Judas Iscariot, who disclosed the whereabouts of Jesus in exchange for thirty pieces of silver. The Agony in the Garden of Gethsemane takes place directly before the Passion of Jesus, which was the final episode of his life before he was crucified to the cross.

Gospel narratives 

According to the Synoptic Gospels, immediately after the Last Supper, Jesus retreated to a garden to pray. Each gospel offers a slightly different account regarding narrative details. The gospels of Matthew and Mark identify this place of prayer as Gethsemane. Jesus was accompanied by three Apostles: Peter, John and James, whom he asked to stay awake and pray. He moved "a stone's throw away" from them, where he felt overwhelming sadness and anguish, and said "My Father, if it is possible, let this cup pass me by. Nevertheless, let it be as You, not I, would have it." Then, a little while later, he said, "If this cup cannot pass by, but I must drink it, Your will be done!". He said this prayer thrice, checking on the three apostles after each prayer and finding them asleep. He commented: "The spirit is willing, but the flesh is weak". An angel came from heaven to strengthen him. During his agony as he prayed, "His sweat was, as it were, great drops of blood falling down upon the ground".

At the conclusion of the narrative, Jesus accepts that the hour has come for him to be betrayed.

Tradition 

In Roman Catholic tradition, the Agony in the Garden is the first Sorrowful Mystery of the Rosary and the First Station of the Scriptural Way of The Cross (second station in the Philippine version). Catholic tradition includes specific prayers and devotions as acts of reparation for the sufferings of Jesus during His Agony and Passion. These Acts of Reparation to Jesus Christ do not involve a petition for a living or dead beneficiary, but aim to "repair the sins" against Jesus. Some such prayers are provided in the Raccolta Catholic prayer book (approved by a Decree of 1854, and published by the Holy See in 1898) which also includes  prayers as Acts of Reparation to the Virgin Mary.

In his encyclical Miserentissimus Redemptor on reparations, Pope Pius XI called Acts of Reparation to Jesus Christ a duty for Catholics and referred to them as "some sort of compensation to be rendered for the injury" with respect to the sufferings of Jesus.

Catholic tradition holds that Jesus' sweating of blood was literal and not figurative.

Holy Hour
In the Catholic tradition,  is the basis of the Holy Hour devotion for Eucharistic adoration. In the Gospel of Matthew: "Then He said to them, 'My soul is very sorrowful even to death; remain here, and watch with Me.'" Coming to the disciples, He found them sleeping and, in Matthew 26:40, asked Peter:

 "So, could you not watch with Me one hour?"

The tradition of the Holy Hour devotion dates back to 1673 when Saint Margaret Mary Alacoque stated that she had a vision of Jesus in which she was instructed to spend an hour every Thursday night to meditate on the suffering of Jesus in the Garden of Gethsemane.

Commentary
Justus Knecht gives three possible causes for Christ's sadness and agony: 1. He saw before Him the many and inhuman torments which awaited Him. He pictured all these terrible sufferings, enduring them in anticipation. 2. Christ took the sins of men on Himself, so as to offer satisfaction to the divine justice in their stead. Now that He was on the point of completing His work of Redemption, the horrible mass of evil, abomination and guilt came before His holy Soul and filled it with abhorrence and aversion. “Him, that knew no sin, for us God hath made sin, that we might be made the justice of God in Him” (2 Cor. 5, 21). 3. He knew beforehand how many souls would be eternally lost in spite of His bitter Passion and Death, because they would not believe in Him and would not love Him.

Roger Baxter in his Meditations reflects on the angel comforting Christ, writing, "Good God! is it possible that the eternal Son of God should borrow comfort from His creatures? Observe how the Father of lights at last sends comfort to those who persevere in prayer. Imagine what reasons the angel might use in comforting your agonizing Saviour. He probably represented to Him the necessity of His passion for the redemption of mankind, and the glory that would redound to His Father and Himself. All this Christ understood infinitely better than the angel, yet He did not refuse the proffer of consolation, in order to teach you to respect the advice and consolation of your inferiors."

Artistic depictions 

There are a number of different depictions in art of the Agony in the Garden, including:
 Agony in the Garden – an early (1459–1465) painting by the Italian Renaissance master Giovanni Bellini
 Agony in the Garden – a painting by romantic poet and artist William Blake, c. 1800, conserved at the Tate Britain in London
 Agony in the Garden – a painting by the Italian artist Correggio, dating to 1524 and now in Apsley House in London
 Agony in the Garden – a painting by the Italian artist Andrea Mantegna, dating from 1458–1460 and conserved at the National Gallery in London
 Agony in the Garden – a painting by Andrea Mantegna, dating from 1457–1459 and conserved at the Musée des Beaux-Arts de Tours
 Agony in the Garden – a 1510s painting by Gerard David formerly attributed to Adriaen Isenbrandt, now in the Musée des Beaux-Arts de Strasbourg
 Christ on the Mount of Olives – a painting by Baroque painter Michelangelo Merisi da Caravaggio, c. 1605
Christ on the Mount of Olives – a painting by Paul Gauguin, 1889
 Christ on the Mount of Olives – an oratorio by classical composer Ludwig van Beethoven
 "Gethsemane (I Only Want to Say)" – In the rock opera Jesus Christ Superstar by Tim Rice and Andrew Lloyd Webber, Jesus sings this song in which He confronts God about His coming fate, ultimately accepting it by the end of the song. An orchestral reprise is heard after the crucifixion in the form of "John Nineteen: Forty-One".

Medical conjectures 
Some in the medical field have hypothesized that Jesus' great anguish caused him to experience hematidrosis.

It is believed that only Luke the Evangelist described Jesus as sweating blood because Luke was a physician.

See also 
 Life of Jesus in the New Testament

Further reading
 , a poem by Felicia Hemans published in The Amulet annual for 1826.

References 

Angelic apparitions in the Bible
Sorrowful Mysteries
Gethsemane